Iambrix salsala, the chestnut bob, is a butterfly belonging to the family Hesperiidae, that is found in parts of South Asia and Southeast Asia.

Subspecies
The subspecies of Iambrix salsala found in India are-
 Iambrix salsala salsala Moore, 1865 
 Iambrix salsala luteipalpis Plötz, 1886

Range

The butterfly occurs in Sri Lanka, India, Nepal, Myanmar, Thailand, Cambodia, Laos, north Vietnam, Hainan, Hong Kong, south Yunnan, Langkawi, Malaysia, Singapore, Tioman, Sumatra and Java.

In India, the butterfly flies in South India, Calcutta, along the Himalayas from Kumaon to Sikkim, Assam and eastwards to Myanmar.

Edward Yerbury Watson (1891) states the butterfly's range as follows:

Description

Watson (1891) gives a detailed description, shown below:

Host plants
The larva has been recorded on Setaria barbata, Bambusa species, Mimosa species.

Cited references

References
Print

Watson, E. Y. (1891) Hesperiidae indicae: being a reprint of descriptions of the Hesperiidae of India, Burma, and Ceylon.. Vest and Co. Madras.

Online

Brower, Andrew V. Z., (2007). Iambrix Watson 1893. Version 4 March 2007 (under construction). Page on genus Iambrix in The Tree of Life Web Project, http://tolweb.org/.

External links
 

Ancistroidini
Butterflies described in 1865
Butterflies of Singapore
Butterflies of Asia
Taxa named by Frederic Moore